Events in chess in 2004:

Deaths
April 30 – Kazimierz Plater (1915–2004), 89, Polish International Master and several time Polish champion.
August 3 – Bryon Nickoloff (1956–2004), 48, Canadian International Master.
August 22 – Konstantin Aseev (1960–2004), 43, Russian Grandmaster and trainer.
September 18 – Michael Valvo (1942–2004), 62, American International Master.
December 28 – Charles Bent (1919–2004), 85,  English endgame study composer.

 
21st century in chess
Chess by year